Alma McClelland (October 1, 1921 – July 18, 2000) was a World Series of Poker champion in the 1989 $500 Ladies - Limit 7 Card Stud event.

As of 2008, her total WSOP tournament winnings exceed $63,960  .

She is the late wife of former World Series of Poker tournament director Jack McClelland.

World Series of Poker bracelets

References

American poker players
World Series of Poker bracelet winners
Female poker players
2000 deaths
1921 births